Frank Edward Young VC (2 October 1895 – 18 September 1918) was a recipient of the Victoria Cross, the highest and most prestigious award for gallantry in the face of the enemy that can be awarded to British and Commonwealth forces.

Early life
The son of a serving soldier in the Bedfordshire Regiment, Frank Young was born in Cherat, British India in October 1895. Having returned to Britain for his schooling, he joined the Hitchin Company of the Hertfordshire Regiment as a Boy Bugler in November 1909, serving as a part-time territorial soldier.

First World War
Following the outbreak of war, Young was found medically unfit for overseas service and had to undergo an operation. In January 1915 he was passed fit and was posted with a reinforcement draft to 1/1st battalion Hertfordshire Regiment, then serving as part of the British Expeditionary Force on the Western Front. His father had rejoined the army and was serving as the battalion's Regimental Sergeant Major. Both father and son saw service through successive engagements in 1915, including the Battles of Festubert and Loos and during this period the latter was promoted to Sergeant. In 1916 he was appointed as a bombing instructor at the Rouen Central Bombing School, but was wounded in an accident. After a period of recovery Young was selected for officer training and was subsequently commissioned as a second lieutenant on 27 April 1917, being posted to a reserve battalion of the Bedfordshire Regiment in Britain. Following an interlude training with the Royal Flying Corps, Young returned to the infantry and was sent to rejoin the 1/1st Hertfordshires in France on 12 September 1918, being appointed commander of No. 4 Company on arrival.

Victoria Cross
The action for which Second Lieutenant Young was to be awarded a posthumous Victoria Cross occurred in the aftermath of Allied success at the Battle of Havrincourt. Soon after he rejoined 1/1st battalion, it was moved into the front-lines south east of Havrincourt, near a copse named Triangle Wood. In the late afternoon of 18 September 1918, after an intense artillery barrage, German troops launched an assault against this position. Although the enemy gained an initial foothold, ultimately the battalion's line held and they were forced to withdraw. Young's actions and leadership in the successful defence resulted in his award of the medal, the full citation for which was published in the London Gazette on 14 December 1918 and read:

Initially Young was listed as missing, however his body was found by a British patrol on 27 September at the edge of Havrincourt Wood. He was subsequently reburied nearby in Hermies Hill British Cemetery, Hermies. The grave stone is located at 3B5.

The medal
His Victoria Cross is displayed at the Bedfordshire and Hertfordshire Regimental Collection at the Wardown Park Museum, Luton, Bedfordshire.

References

1895 births
1918 deaths
People from Nowshera District
Hertfordshire Regiment soldiers
Hertfordshire Regiment officers
British World War I recipients of the Victoria Cross
British Army personnel of World War I
British military personnel killed in World War I
British Army recipients of the Victoria Cross
People from Hitchin
Military personnel of British India